Paramparça (English title: Broken Pieces) is a Turkish television series produced by Endemol Shine Turkey, starring Erkan Petekkaya, Nurgül Yeșilçay and Ebru Özkan Saban. It premiered on Star TV on December 1, 2014.

Plot 
The story follows two women whose lives are intertwined following an accident. Gülseren who is pregnant, is hit by a car and brought to hospital to give birth. Meanwhile, Dilara gives birth at the same hospital. Due to a similarity in their surnames, the nurses switch the babies while taking to intensive care nursery and wrongfully given to wrong parents; Gülseren's baby given to Dilara and Dilara's baby given to Gülseren. Fifteen years later, Gülseren lives with her adoptive daughter Hazal and sister-in-law Keriman in a poor apartment and Dilara lives with her adoptive daughter Cansu and biological son Ozan in a luxurious villa in the seashore of Bosphorus. Gülseren works as saleswoman in small store. Dilara's relationship with her husband Cihan, a rich businessman, breaks down and Cihan leaves her. He starts dating Gülseren, which aggravates Dilara.

Cihan's childhood friend Harun, who has been in love with Dilara since they were students, comes to Istanbul to take revenge on Cihan for the death of his sister who committed suicide after she and Cihan broke up. Harun tries to win Dilara's heart as he had never married because of his love for her. Cihan proposes to Gülseren and Dilara becomes pregnant carrying Harun's baby. On the day of Cihan and Gülseren's wedding, Gülseren is accidentally shot and killed by the ex-husband of Ozan's girlfriend. After Gülseren's death, Cihan's life becomes complicated and he remarries Dilara but neither Dilara or Cihan are happy about this remarriage. Dilara falls in love with Harun while Cihan falls in love with Ayşe, a well-known psychiatrist and kickboxer; she is identified by Cihan as the cousin of Harun and leaves Dilara for her, in the meantime, Dilara cannot abort her baby and compassionately gives birth to the child. Ayşe is killed as she intrudes on Cihan father, who accidentally shot her to death while he was about to committing suicide.
 
The final season shows the different lives of the characters, Cihan is seen embarking, and exhausted with flashbacks of his earlier events, Dilara marries Harun and both live with their child, Alaz, in Dilara's home, siblings Hazal and Ozan become business partners, and Cansu prematurely marries Deniz and expects a baby, However she loses her baby because of her Parkinson's disease.

Soon Cihan returns to his family, and everyone welcomes him except Harun, who is still jealous and thinks that he had affair with Dilara. Harun becomes delighted when he discovers that Ozan is his biological son, but he is tragically killed in a mass shooting prepatrated by his client Damir's men while shielding Ozan from gunshot. This provides a great opportunity for Cihan and Dilara's relationship to grow because they fall for each other. Damir, who is wanted by Cihan, secretly dates Hazal, without acknowledging his connection with the mafia and the murder of Harun. Damir and Hazal finally cut off their connection until she admits the truth. The series ends with the assassination of Damir carried out by Cihan, and it goes with the wedding of Cihan and Dilara.

Cast

Series overview

International broadcasts 
{| class="wikitable"
! Country 
! TV 
! Premiere date
! Title
|-
|  (Iraqi Kurdistan)
| Kurdmax
|  April 1, 2015
| Parçe parçe bun
|-
| 
| 1TV
| May 2015
| Broken Pieces
|-
| 
| Asian TV
| December 2020
| আয়েশা/মরিয়ম ( Aysha/Moriom  ) 
|-
| 
| LNK
| LNK: August 5, 2015; 
| Gyvenimo šukės|-
| 
| ANTV
| September 7, 2015
| Cansu & Hazal|-
| 
| Imedi TV
| September 7, 2015
| ნამსხვრევები|-
| 
| GEM TV
| October 3, 2015
| Güzel (گوزل)|-
| 
| Kanal D  Happy Channel 
| October 5, 2015  August 8, 2022
| Furtună pe Bosfor|-
| 
| Mega Channel
| October 19, 2015
| Pαγισμένες καρδιές (Broken hearts)|-
| 
| bTVbTV Lady
| November 9, 2015January 14, 2018
| Tвоят мой живот|-
| 
| Habar TV
| November 11, 2015
| Осколки|-
| 
| Alsat-MSitel
| December 15, 2015October 3, 2016
| Fate të lidhura (Albanian)Парампарче (Macedonian)
|-
| 
| TV Klan
| December 19, 2015
| Fate të kryqëzuara|-
| 
| Nova TV
| January 4, 2016
| Tuđi život|-
| 
| TV2
| February 15, 2016
| Megtört szívek|-
|-
| 
| TVP1
| March 8, 2016
| Rozdarte serca|-
|  Arab World
| OSN Yahala
| March 20, 2016
| Ishq W Domou|-
| 
| Viva+
| May 1, 2016
| רסיסים (Shards)|-
| 
| Prva TV  Prva world
| July 18, 2016  June 1, 2017
| Paramparčad|-
| 
| TV Doma
| August 1, 2016
| Vymenené životy|-
| 
| 1+1
|  August 8, 2016
| Уламки щастя|-
| 
| SVT2
| August 22, 2016
| Förväxlingen|-
| 
| Prva CG
| August 29, 2016
| Paramparčad|-
| 
| Kanal 2
| October 10, 2016
| Purunenud elud|-
| 
| Asian Box
| January 12, 2017
| Аз жаргалын хэлтэрхий|-
| 
| Canal 13 (Chile)
| January 16, 2017
| Paramparça|-
|
|Kana TV
| July 4, 2017 – June 17, 2018  January 21, 2019 – August 21, 2019
|ሽንቁር ልቦች (Broken Hearts)|-
|
|EExtra
| October 1, 2018
|Gebroke Harte|-
| 
| Planet TV 
| July 3, 2017  November 2018 December 2019 – June 2020
| Tuje življenje|-
| 
| OBN
| January 30, 2018
| Paramparčad|-
| 
| Imagen
| January 8, 2019
|Vidas cruzadas|-
|  
| Qazaqstan TV
| November 5, 2019 
|Шытынаған тағдыр|-
| 
| Caracol TV 
| August 26, 2019 
|Lazos de sangre|-
|
|Nova
|July 19, 2021
|Vidas cruzadas|-
|}

See also
 Switched at Birth'', 2011–17 TV series

References

External links 
  
 

2014 Turkish television series debuts
2017 Turkish television series endings
Turkish drama television series
Star TV (Turkey) original programming
Television series by Endemol
Television series produced in Istanbul
Television shows set in Istanbul
Television series set in the 2010s